These are the Australian Country number-one albums of 2019, per the ARIA Charts.

See also
2019 in music
List of number-one albums of 2019 (Australia)

References

2019
Australia country albums
Number-one country albums